George Halpin (Sr.) (1779? – 8 July 1854), was a prominent civil engineer and lighthouse builder, responsible for the construction of much of the Port of Dublin, several of Dublin's bridges, and a number of lighthouses; he is considered the founding father of the Irish lighthouse service. His son, was also a well-known lighthouse builder.

Biography

Very little is known of Halpin's early life, though it is known that his background was in the building trade rather than in engineering. In 1800, he was made the Inspector of Works for the Dublin Ballast Board (the predecessor to the Commissioners of Irish Lights), succeeding Francis Tunstall, and in this capacity was responsible for a number of works. One of these, the Bull Wall, along with associated projects, led to the creation of Bull Island in Dublin Bay, and enabled deep-draught ships to use the port for the first time.

Halpin was appointed the Inspector of Lighthouses in 1810. Between then and 1867 Irish lighthouses increased from fourteen to seventy-two under his direction. He established 53 new lighthouses, in addition to modernising a further 15: his projects included the Baily Lighthouse, the second Copeland Island Lighthouse, and the Skelligs Lighthouse. He also set up the Irish lighthouse service's administration and management procedures, regularised employment of lighthouse keepers, and continued to oversee the development of Dublin's port.

Halpin died in 1854, and was buried in Mount Jerome Cemetery, Dublin. He was succeeded as Inspector of Lighthouses by his son.

See also
Lighthouses in Ireland

References
Notes

Sources
 Gillingan, H. A. History of The Port of Dublin, Gill & Macmillen, 1988, contains an overview of Halpin's career.
 Skempton, Sir A. & Chrimes, M. (eds) A Biographical Dictionary of Civil Engineers in Great Britain and Ireland: 1500 to 1830, Thomas Telford, 2002, 

1779 births
1854 deaths
Irish civil engineers
Lighthouse builders
Burials at Mount Jerome Cemetery and Crematorium